Arata Isozaki (磯崎 新, Isozaki Arata; 23 July 1931 – 28 December 2022) was a Japanese architect, urban designer, and theorist from Ōita. He was awarded the Royal Gold Medal in 1986 and the Pritzker Architecture Prize in 2019. He has taught at Columbia University, Harvard University, and Yale University.

Biography
Isozaki was born in Oita on the island of Kyushu and grew up in the era of postwar Japan, the eldest of four children of Toji and Tetsu Isozaki. His father was a prominent businessmen. In 1945, he witnessed the destruction of Hiroshima on the shore opposite his hometown.  When he accepted the Pritzker Prize in 2019 he stated: "There was no architecture, no buildings, and not even a city. So my first experience of architecture was the void of architecture, and I began to consider how people might rebuild their homes and cities."

Isozaki completed his schooling at the Oita Prefecture Oita Uenogaoka High School (erstwhile Oita Junior High School). In 1954, he graduated from the University of Tokyo where he majored in Architecture and Engineering. He completed a doctoral program in architecture from the same university in 1961. Isozaki also worked under Kenzo Tange before establishing his own firm in 1963.

Isozaki's early projects were influenced by European experiences with a style mixed between "New Brutalism" and "Metabolist Architecture" (Oita Medical Hall, 1959–1960), according to Reyner Banham. His style continued to evolve with buildings such as the Fujimi Country Club (1973–74) and Kitakyushu Central Library (1973–74). Later he developed a more modernistic style with buildings such as the Art Tower of Mito (1986–90) and Domus-Casa del Hombre (1991–1995) in Galicia, Spain. In 1983, he supported an apparently unbuildable entry for a sports club in Hong King by the then-unknown architect Zaha Hadid. In 1985 he designed the interior of New York City's  Palladium nightclub. The Museum of Contemporary Art (MOCA) in Los Angeles, completed in 1986, was his second international project and his best known work in the U.S.  

In 2005, Arata Isozaki founded the Italian branch of his office, Arata Isozaki & Andrea Maffei Associates. Two major projects from this office are the Allianz Tower CityLife office tower, a redevelopment project in the former trade fair area in Milan and the new Town Library in Maranello, Italy. 

Despite designing buildings both inside and outside Japan, Isozaki was sometimes described as an architect who refused to be stuck in one architectural style, highlighting "how each of his designs is a specific solution born out of the project’s context." Isozaki won the Pritzker Architecture Prize in 2019.

Isozaki died on 28 December 2022, at the age of 91.

Awards
Annual Prize, Architectural Institute of Japan in 1967 and 1975
Mainichi Art Award in 1983
 RIBA Gold Medal in 1986
International Award "Architecture in Stone" in 1987
Arnold W. Brunner Memorial Prize of the American Academy and Institute of Arts and Letters in 1988
Chicago Architecture Award in 1990
Honor Award, the American Institute of Architects in 1992
RIBA Honorary Fellow in 1994
Golden Lion, 6 Venice Biennale of Architecture in 1996
The European Cultural Centre (ECC) Architecture Award in 2012
Pritzker Prize in 2019

Gallery

Notable works
Ōita Prefectural Library, (1962–1966) Ōita, Ōita, Japan
Kitakyushu Municipal Museum of Art (1972–1974) in Fukuoka, Japan
 Kitakyushu Central Library (1973–1974) in Fukuoka, Japan
 Museum of Modern Art, Gunma (1974) in Takasaki, Japan
Museum of Contemporary Art (MOCA), (1981–1986) Los Angeles, California, United States
Sports Hall for the 1992 Summer Olympics, (1983–1990) Barcelona, Spain
Ochanomizu Square Building – Casals Hall, (1984–1987) Tokyo, Japan
Palladium nightclub building interior  (1985) in New York City, United States
Lake Sagami Country Clubhouse (1987–1989), with stained glass skylights and lantern by Brian Clarke, Yamanishi, Japan
Art Tower Mito, Mito, (1986–1990) Ibaraki, Japan
Team Disney Orlando, (1987–1990) Florida, United States
Bond University, – Library, Administration Building, Faculty of Humanities Building (1987–1989) Gold Coast, Australia
 KitaKyushu International Conference Center (1987–1990) Fukuoka, Japan
 Palafolls Sports Complex Pavilion, (1987–1996) Barcelona, Spain
Centre of Japanese Art and Technology, (1990–1994) Kraków, Poland
Nagi Museum Of Contemporary Art, (1991–1994) Okayama, Japan
Kyoto Concert Hall, (1991–1995) Kyoto, Japan
Nara Centennial Hall, (1992–1998) Nara, Japan
Domus: La Casa del Hombre, (1993–1995) A Coruña, Spain
Shizuoka Performing Arts Center (SPAC), (1993–1998) Shizuoka, Japan, opened 1999 for the second Theatre Olympics
COSI Columbus, (1994–1999) Columbus, Ohio, United States
Municipal Daycare and Hospital Complex (1997－1998) Tokyo, Japan
Shenzhen Cultural Center, (1998–2007) Shenzhen, China
 Includes Shenzhen Library and Shenzhen Concert Hall
New entrance of the CaixaForum Barcelona building, (1999–2002) Barcelona, Spain
Isozaki Atea, (1999–2009) Bilbao, Spain
Torino Palasport Olimpico, (2000–2006) Turin, Italy
Museum of the Central Academy of Fine Arts in Beijing, (2003–2008) China
New Concert Hall Building, (2003–) Thessaloniki, Greece, 2010
Himalayas Center, (2003–) Shanghai, China
Pavilion of Japanese Army in World War II, Jianchuan Museum Cluster, (2004–2015) Chengdu, China
Diamond Island, (2006–) Ho Chi Minh City, Vietnam (complete in 2012)
Coliseum da Coruña, A Coruña, Galicia, Spain, 1991
Weill Cornell Medical College in Qatar, Education City, near Doha
 Qatar National Convention Center, opened 2011
 New Town Library (2012) in Maranello, Italy (Arata Isozaki and Andrea Maffei)
 D38 Office (2012) in Barcelona, Spain
Allianz Tower (Il Dritto) (2015), in Milan, Italy (Arata Isozaki and Andrea Maffei)
Harbin Concert Hall (2015), in Harbin, China

Current projects
The University of Central Asia's three campuses in Tekeli, Kazakhstan; Naryn, the Kyrgyz Republic; and Khorog, Tajikistan
 The New exit for the Uffizi Gallery, Florence, Italy – competition winner (Arata Isozaki and Andrea Maffei)
 The renovation of the Bologna Centrale railway station, Bologna, Italy – competition winner
 Metropolis Thao Dien, Ho Chi Minh City, Vietnam

References

External links

 Arata Isozaki & associates
 
 Corkill, Edan. "Arata Isozaki: Astonishing by design". Japan Times, 1 June 2008.
 Sarah F. Maclaren, "Arata Isozaki e la fine dell’utopia", in "Il senso della fine", Ágalma. Rivista di studi culturali e di estetica, 19, 2009: 61–75. ISSN 1723-0284.
 CityLife Official website of the project
 Liddell, Colin. "Arata Isozaki: Solaris". Metropolis, 23 January 2014.

1931 births
2022 deaths
Japanese architects
University of Tokyo alumni
People from Ōita (city)
Recipients of the Royal Gold Medal
Commanders of the Order of Merit of the Republic of Poland

Members of the Japan Art Academy
Honorary Members of the Royal Academy
Members of the American Academy of Arts and Letters
Members of the Polish Academy of Learning
Pritzker Architecture Prize winners
Columbia University faculty
Harvard University faculty
Yale University faculty